Searching for Sonny is a 2011 independent film and the feature film debut of writer/director Andrew Disney. The film released on October 22, 2011 and stars Jason Dohring as one of several people involved in a murder mystery.

Plot
Elliott (Jason Dohring), Calvin (Nick Kocher), Gary (Brian McElhaney) and Eden (Minka Kelly), find themselves chief suspects in a murder mystery at their ten-year high school reunion. The events surrounding the disappearance of their friend Sonny (Masi Oka), is reminiscent of a high school play they once performed, coincidentally written by Sonny himself. Deception leads to scandal and the truth surfaces as the friends learn that shady businessmen and school officials are involved in a complex scheme of money and murder.

Cast
 Jason Dohring as Elliot Knight
 Minka Kelly as Eden Mercer
 Masi Oka as Sonny Bosco
 Michael Hogan as Principal Faden
 Nick Kocher as Calvin Knight
 Brian McElhaney as Gary Noble
 Clarke Peters as The Narrator
 Mackinlee Waddell as Maggie Phillips
 Brandon Thornton as Zack Hayes
 Kristin Sutton as Cynthia Schubert

Reception
Critical reception for Searching for Sonny has been mostly positive and The Hollywood Reporter summed the film up as "Quirky, comic film noir proves yet again that high school reunions never turn out well." Much of the film's praise centered around the film's acting and directing, and the Oklaholma Gazette commented that Disney's work helped to make the film look "like several million dollars were poured into the thing".

Awards
Best Screenplay at the Phoenix Film Festival (2012, won) 
Best Ensemble at the Phoenix Film Festival (2012, won)
Best Narrative Feature at the Festivus Film Festival (2012, won)

References

External links
 
 
 Kickstarter campaign

2011 films
2011 comedy films
2011 directorial debut films
2011 independent films
2010s crime comedy films
American crime comedy films
American detective films
American independent films
American neo-noir films
American teen films
Films about missing people
Films shot in Texas
Kickstarter-funded films
2010s English-language films
2010s American films